The 100th Massachusetts General Court, consisting of the Massachusetts Senate and the Massachusetts House of Representatives, met in 1879 during the governorship of Thomas Talbot. John B. D. Cogswell served as president of the Senate and Levi C. Wade served as speaker of the House.

Members earned a salary of $500 per year.

Notable legislation included the "Act to Give Women the Right to Vote for Members of School Committees."

Senators

Representatives

 George William Lowther

See also
 1879 Massachusetts gubernatorial election
 46th United States Congress
 List of Massachusetts General Courts

References

Further reading
  (includes description of legislature)

External links
 
 

Political history of Massachusetts
Massachusetts legislative sessions
massachusetts
1879 in Massachusetts